Paachuvum Albhuthavilakkum is an Indian Malayalam-language drama film written and directed by Akhil Sathyan, son of Sathyan Anthikad, in his debut. It features Fahadh Faasil alongside an ensemble supporting cast including Viji Venkatesh, Anjana Jayaprakash, Innocent, Indrans, Mohan Agashe and Mukesh.

Plot
The story of a middle-class Malayali youth who settles in Mumbai and the incidents that take place on a journey to Kerala.

Cast
Fahadh Faasil
Viji Venkatesh
Anjana Jayaprakash
Dhwani Rajesh
Mukesh
Innocent
Vineeth
Indrans
Althaf Salim
Mohan Agashe
Chhaya Kadam
Piyush Kumar
Abhiram Radhakrishnan
Avyukth Menon

Release
Akhil Sathyan, the director of the movie has confirmed in his facebook post that the movie is slated for a release on 28 April, 2023.

References

External links

2023 films
Indian drama films
Malayalam-language films